Spring in Prague is an album by jazz pianist Mal Waldron recorded in 1990 and released on the Japanese Alfa Jazz label.

Track listing
All compositions by Mal Waldron except as indicated
 "Revolution" – 6:05
 "East of the Sun" – 7:57
 "Let us Live - dedicated to East-Germany" – 6:12
 "Spring in Prague" – 7:00
 "On a Clear Day" – 6:42
 "Spring is Here" (Lorenz Hart, Richard Rodgers) – 5:35
 "We Demand" – 10:07 
Recorded in Munich, West Germany on February 19 & 20, 1990

Personnel
Mal Waldron — piano
Paulo Cardoso — bass 
John Betsch — drums

References

1989 albums
Mal Waldron albums